Huang Pu (born 1 July 1994) is a Chinese footballer who currently plays for Ji'nan Xingzhou in China League Two.

Club career
Huang Pu started his football career when he played for China League Two side Shandong Youth in 2011 and 2012. He moved to Campeonato de Portugal side Mafra on a free transfer in September 2013. Huang played for Vila F. Rosário, 1º de Dezembro and Oliveirense between 2014 and 2015. Huang returned to Shandong Luneng in January 2016. On 4 May 2016, he made his debut for Shandong in the last group match of 2016 AFC Champions League against Buriram United with a 0–0 away draw, coming on as a substitution for Cheng Yuan in the 86th minute. He was demoted to the Shandong Luneng reserved team in 2018.

In February 2019, Huang transferred to home town club Shaanxi Chang'an Athletic who newly promoted to China League One.

Career statistics 
Statistics accurate as of match played 31 December 2020.

References

External links

1994 births
Living people
Chinese footballers
Footballers from Shaanxi
Sportspeople from Xi'an
C.D. Mafra players
AD Oliveirense players
Shandong Taishan F.C. players
Shaanxi Chang'an Athletic F.C. players
Chinese Super League players
China League One players
China League Two players
Association football forwards
Chinese expatriate footballers
Expatriate footballers in Portugal
Chinese expatriate sportspeople in Portugal